Pillanleufú River (Mapudungun for river of the pillán) is a river in Futrono, southern Chile. It drains waters from the southern and eastern slopes of Mocho-Choshuenco volcano to Maihue Lake, which in turn flows by Calcurrupe River into Ranco Lake. The river flows in a north-south direction along the Liquiñe-Ofqui Fault.

See also
List of rivers of Chile

Rivers of Chile
Rivers of Los Ríos Region
Mapuche language